Lig Sinn i gCathú is a novel by the Irish writer Breandán Ó hEithir.

Title
Its title refers to the Lord's Prayer (or "Our Father"): 
forgive us our trespasses,
as we forgive those who trespass against us,
and lead us not into temptation,
but deliver us from evil.

Plot
The story is set in the university town of Baile an Chaisil, a thinly disguised city of Galway, in 1949, the year Ireland declared itself a republic and withdrew from the Commonwealth of Nations. Máirtín Ó Mealóid, a pub-crawling university student, and his disreputable friends are too busy drinking and lusting after girls to pay much attention to this significant political development.  The story takes place over four days from Thursday 14 April to Monday 18 April.

Publication
The novel was written and published in Irish, then translated into English and German. An extract from the book was formerly on the curriculum of Honours Level Irish in the Leaving Certificate secondary school examination. It was the first Irish-language book ever to top Ireland's hardback best-seller list.

The book was launched at Kennys, and the event aired live for an hour and a half on RTÉ Radio 1.

References

1976 novels
Irish historical novels
Irish-language literature
Novels set in the 1940s
20th-century Irish novels